Epacris navicularis is a species of flowering plant in the heath family Ericaceae and is endemic to south-western Tasmania. It is a shrub with crowded, overlapping egg-shaped leaves arranged in five rows, and bell-shaped white flowers crowded in upper leaf axils.

Description
The flowers are arranged singly in leaf axils forming a cluster near the ends of branches. Flowering occurs from January to March.

Taxonomy and naming
Epacris navicularis was first formally described in 1978 by S. Jean Jarman in the Papers and Proceedings of the Royal Society of Tasmania from specimens collected on Mount Sprent (near the Serpentine Dam) in 1977. The specific epithet (navicularis) means "boat-shaped".

Distribution and habitat
This epacris grows in exposed alpine heathland in south-western Tasmania, including on Frenchmans Cap.

References

navicularis
Ericales of Australia
Flora of Tasmania
Plants described in 1978
Endemic flora of Australia